Split Second is a 2004 Hong Kong crime thriller television drama produced by TVB and Thailand's TV3, with Marco Law serving as the executive producer. It ran from October 4, 2004 to November 12, 2004, with the total of 30 episodes.

This show uses a format similar to the American series 24. Each one-hour episode represents one day in the show's timeline, and an on-screen digital clock appears in the show regularly to remind viewers the time in the storyline.

Synopsis 

This story is about the 30-day game of chasing between the Hong Kong police and the Hong Kong Triads, who are allegedly linked to the Thai mafia. The story starts on April 1, 2004 with an attack on the police commissioner, and ends on April 30, 2004, with the deaths of many good people.

Characters 

Fung Chi Wai (Alex Fong (方中信)) — A Hong Kong Policeman tried to find evidence in order to arrest the group of triads in Hong Kong which is also linked with the Thai mafia.
Wong Ka Fai (Kevin Cheng (鄭嘉穎)) — Chief Inspector of Hong Kong CIB, team A. Knowing himself has brain  cancer and not much time left, he tried to find the mole inside the CIB, who is placed by the Hong Kong triads.
Yeung Kai Tung (Patrick Tam (譚耀文)) — Originally an ordinary Hong Kong police constable (PC) but later became an undercover in the Hong Kong triads.
Hau Man Wah (Marco Ngai (魏駿傑)) — The most trustable person in the Hong Kong triads by the most notable Thai mafia head, Cheng Kuan.
Pang Wai (Yoyo Mung (蒙嘉慧)) — A girl who help Fung Chi Wai a lot in collecting the evidence of the Hong Kong triads.

Cast 

 Alex Fong as Fung Chi Wai (馮志偉)
 Kevin Cheng as Wong Ka Fai (Vincent) (黃嘉輝)
 Patrick Tam as Yeung Kai Dong (Ah Dong) (楊啟東)
 Marco Ngai as Hao Mun Wa (侯文華)
 Yoyo Mung as Pang Wai (彭慧)
 Chatchai Plengpanich as Sam
 Sririta Jensen as Rita
 Claire Yiu as Zhu Wing Kei (朱詠琪)
 Johnson Lee (李思捷) as Gum Yu Loi/Hung Mao (金悅來)(熊貓)
 Lau Kong (劉江) as Cheng Kwan/Lee Man Ho (鄭坤/李萬豪)
 Mark Kwok (郭耀明) as Hung Pui Kei (洪培基)
 Fiona Yuen as Lo Sau Ling (羅秀玲)
 Mandy Cho as Tang Wai Ting (鄧偉晴)
 Raymond Tsang (曾守明) as Ho Chiu Kuen (何超權)
 Eric Li (李天翔) as Yip Tin Sing (葉天成)
 Benz Hui as Lam Yau Wai (林有威)
 Lai Lok-yi as Kur Gin Fung (區健風)
 Eddy Ko as Wong Jung Yeung (王掁揚) (Wong Sir)
 Moses Chan as Luk Yiu Gwok (陸耀國)
 Miki Yeung (楊愛瑾) as Fung Mei Yun (馮美茵)

Music 

 Opening Theme Instrumental

 Insert Songs
 Heaven Knows by Rick Price
 Moon River
 A Part of Me

External links 
 

2004 Hong Kong television series debuts
2004 Hong Kong television series endings
TVB dramas